Hugo Sandoval Martínez (born 25 December 1962) is a Mexican politician affiliated with the PRD. As of 2013 he served as Deputy of the LXII Legislature of the Mexican Congress representing the Federal District as replacement of Alejandro Sánchez Camacho.

References

1962 births
Living people
People from Mexico City
Party of the Democratic Revolution politicians
21st-century Mexican politicians
Deputies of the LXII Legislature of Mexico
Members of the Chamber of Deputies (Mexico) for Mexico City